Thandor: The Invasion is a real-time strategy video game, which was developed by Innonics and published by JoWooD Productions on December 1, 2000  released on Microsoft Windows.

It was met with negative reception. The graphics was measured as good, but resource-consuming. Many complaints caused by units behavioral model. Developers of game and critics says that storyline is present, but is not interesting (developers wanted to focus on gameplay).

Plot

Before starting company you can choose the difficulty, but you choose not the "smartness" of AI, but only power of enemy's units in comparense to your units.

Multiplayer

Reception

References

Real-time strategy video games
Video games developed in Germany
Windows games
Windows-only games
2000 video games
JoWooD Entertainment games
Buka Entertainment games
Multiplayer and single-player video games